David A. Weitz (born October 3, 1951) is a Canadian/American physicist and Mallinckrodt Professor of Physics & Applied Physics and professor of Systems Biology at Harvard University. He is the co-director of the BASF Advanced Research Initiative at Harvard, co-director of the Harvard Kavli Institute for Bionano Science & Technology, and director of the Harvard Materials Research Science & Engineering Center. He is best known for his work in the areas of diffusing-wave spectroscopy, microrheology, microfluidics, rheology, fluid mechanics, interface and colloid science, colloid chemistry, biophysics, complex fluids, soft condensed matter physics, phase transitions, the study of glass and amorphous solids, liquid crystals, self-assembly, surface-enhanced light scattering, and diffusion-limited aggregation. More recently, his laboratory has developed Force spectrum microscopy, which is capable of measuring random intracellular forces. As of March 2023, he has a Hirsch index of 199.

Weitz received his B.Sc. in physics from the University of Waterloo and his PhD in superconductivity from Harvard. He then worked as a research physicist at Exxon Research and Engineering for nearly 18 years, leading the Interfaces and Inhomogeneous Materials Group and Complex Fluids Area. He then became a Professor of Physics at the University of Pennsylvania, before moving to Harvard in 1999.

In 2016, Weitz was elected a member of the National Academy of Engineering for "discoveries of complex fluids, colloids, and emulsions, which have resulted in new products and companies". Weitz is also an elected member of the National Academy of Science and the American Academy of Arts & Sciences.

See also
 List of University of Waterloo people

References

External links
Experimental Soft Condensed Matter Group Homepage
Harvard Physics Department Listing
The Weitzlab Guide to Good Paper Writing
Weitz profile page, Wyss Institute

1951 births
21st-century American physicists
Harvard University alumni
Harvard University faculty
Fellows of the American Physical Society
Foreign members of the Chinese Academy of Engineering
Living people